Where You Stand is the seventh studio album from Scottish rock band Travis, released on 19 August 2013, on their own record label, Red Telephone Box via Kobalt Label Services. The album was produced by Michael Ilbert, and promoted by three singles: "Where You Stand", "Moving" and "Mother". It is the first album released by the band after a five-year break.

Background
Where You Stand is the band's first new album in five years, as their sixth studio record Ode to J. Smith was released in 2008. Speaking about the band's departure from the spotlight, bassist Dougie Payne said of the release: "You stay away as long as it takes, so you feel that hunger and desire to get back to it same as you did at the start." It is also their first which all the members were contributed on songwriting, rather than the vocalist Fran Healy, who served as the lyricist on their first six studio albums.

Release and packaging
The album was released in a number of different versions:
 Standard digital release – containing eleven tracks, with registration to access all areas;
 Standard physical release – with eleven tracks, fourteen-page roll-fold booklet and registration to access all areas; 
 Deluxe physical release – with thirteen tracks, including bonus tracks "Anniversary" and "Parallel Lines (Daydream)", plus DVD with the making of the album and 'Where You Stand' music video, and registration to access all areas; 
 Heavyweight vinyl release – with eleven tracks, registration to access all areas and code for download version of the album;
 Super deluxe box set – including deluxe thirteen track CD album with bonus DVD, heavyweight vinyl release with 11 tracks, code for download version of the album, registration to access all areas, a vinyl sleeve signed by the band, 12" x 12" art photo of the band, T-shirt designed by Fran Healy, all kept in a collector's edition presentation box;
 Special Japanese deluxe edition – with exclusive bonus track "Ferris Wheel".

Promotion
On 20 March 2013, the band released a song titled "Another Guy", together with a music video directed by Wolfgang Becker, as a teaser for the album.

Travis supported the release of Where You Stand with a number of live performances, including T in the Park on 13 July 2013, as well as at Sandown Park Racecourse on 24 July, and at V Festival on 17–18 August 2013, just two days before the album's release.

The album was also promoted by three singles.
"Where You Stand" was released as the album's lead single on 30 April 2013. A music video for the song premiered on VEVO the same day. The single was accompanied by a shorter radio mix, which also used more orchestration on the chorus.
"Moving" was released as the second single on 1 July 2013, together with an accompanying music video.
The third and final single from the album, "Mother", was released on 4 November 2013. A music video for the song was released on 15 October 2013.

Critical reception

Where You Stand received generally favorable reviews from music critics. At Metacritic, which assigns a normalized rating out of 100 to reviews from mainstream critics, the album received an average score of 70, based on 19 reviews.

Track listing

Personnel

Travis
Fran Healy – vocals, guitar, drums, programming, design, photography 
Dougie Payne – bass guitar, acoustic guitar, piano, programming, background vocals
Andy Dunlop – guitar, piano, programming, background vocals
Neil Primrose – drums

Additional personnel
 Michael Ilbert – production, mixing
 Tom Coyne – mastering
 Aya Merrill – assistant
 Nick Terry – assistant
 Nick Freemantle – photography
 Ian McAndrew – management

Charts

Release history

References

Travis (band) albums
2013 albums